Iravon is a village in Konni taluk, Pathanamthitta district in the state of Kerala, India. It is located near the banks of Achankovil river. Rubber cultivation is a major source of income for the local population. Iravon borders Konni reserved forest area.

References 

Villages in Pathanamthitta district